"En gang til" is a single from Norwegian DJ and electronic music duo Broiler and Norwegian band Sirkus Eliassen. It was released in Norway on 20 June 2013 for digital download. The song peaked at number 8 on the Norwegian Singles Chart. The song is included on Broiler's debut studio album The Beginning (2013).

Track listing

Chart performance

Weekly charts

Release history

References

2013 singles
DJ Broiler songs
Universal Music Group singles
2013 songs